The 2010 mid-year rugby union tests (also known as the Summer Internationals in the Northern Hemisphere) refers to the rugby union Internationals that were played from late May to late June, mostly in the Southern Hemisphere.

For Australia, New Zealand and South Africa, the tests constituted preparation for the 2010 Tri Nations.

The first nation to announce its fixtures for this series was Australia, which unveiled its schedule on 21 September 2009.

South Africa announced its fixtures on 8 October 2009, but delayed announcing the venues since it simultaneously hosted the 2010 FIFA World Cup. FIFA regulations call for World Cup venues to be handed over to FIFA 15 days before the World Cup starts. FIFA also prohibits any other major sporting events from being held in host cities from 7 days before the opening of the World Cup and until 7 days after its end. An agreement was reached between the South African Rugby Union and the local World Cup organising committee to allow the match against France to be held at SARU's intended venue of Newlands in Cape Town, a non-World Cup venue in a World Cup city.

Overview

Series

Other tours

Matches

Week 1

 As is typical for Barbarians matches, this was an uncapped match for England.

Week 2

 As is typical for Barbarians matches, this was an uncapped match for Ireland.

Week 3

 Dan Carter became the fourth player in history to score 1,000 test points, after Jonny Wilkinson, Neil Jenkins and Diego Domínguez. He ended the day in third on the all-time list, surpassing Domínguez.
 Sam Whitelock (New Zealand) made his international debut.

 Scotland become the first side to defeat Argentina in Tucumán.

Week 4

 This was intended to be the last rugby test played at Carisbrook; however, the stadium would host the All Blacks' 2011 World Cup warm-up match against Fiji. Carisbrook's replacement, Forsyth Barr Stadium, ultimately opened in August 2011.

 This was England's first victory in the Southern Hemisphere since the 2003 Rugby World Cup.

 Scotland earn their first series win ever against Argentina.

Week 5

 This was referee Jonathan Kaplan's 17th game involving New Zealand, a new refereeing record for games involving any one country.

 Springbok captain John Smit became the first rugby player to win 50 tests as captain.
 Bryan Habana scored his 38th test try, equalling the South African record of Joost van der Westhuizen.

 This game was referee Stuart Dickinson's 50th test match.
 Argentina score their biggest win ever over France. The Pumas' previous record win over Les Bleus was their 34–10 win in the third-place game of the 2007 Rugby World Cup.
 Argentina captain Felipe Contepomi became the 18th player in history to amass 500 career test points.

See also
Mid-year rugby union test series
2010 end-of-year rugby union tests
2010 Asian Five Nations
2010 IRB Churchill Cup
2010 IRB Pacific Nations Cup
2010 IRB Nations Cup

References

2010
2010–11 in European rugby union
2009–10 in European rugby union
2010 in Oceanian rugby union
2010 in South American rugby union
2010 in South African rugby union
2010–11 in Scottish rugby union